Ca' d'Andrea is a comune (municipality) in the Province of Cremona in the Italian region Lombardy, located about  southeast of Milan and about  east of Cremona.

Ca' d'Andrea borders the following municipalities: Cappella de' Picenardi, Cingia de' Botti, Derovere, San Martino del Lago, Torre de' Picenardi, Voltido.

History 
On January 1, 1868, the municipalities of Brolpasino, Breda Guazzona, Casanova d'Offredi, Fossa Guazzona, Pieve San Maurizio and Ronca de' Golferami were aggregated into the municipality of Cà d'Andrea.

On June 10, 2018, the inhabitants in a referendum voted to merge by incorporation with the municipality of Torre de' Picenardi, which became effective on January 1, 2019.

References

Cities and towns in Lombardy